K. Victor Chow is a professor of finance at West Virginia University.

Publications
See Google Scholar

References

Year of birth missing (living people)
Place of birth missing (living people)
Living people
American business theorists
West Virginia University faculty